Conasprella bajanensis is a species of sea snail, a marine gastropod mollusk in the family Conidae, the cone snails and their allies.

Like all species within the genus Conasprella, these snails are predatory and venomous. They are capable of "stinging" humans, therefore live ones should be handled carefully or not at all.

Description
Despite its name associating this (obviously-continental-shelf) Cone shell with Barbados,
it is highly likely the type material for this species was acquired from shrimpers at one time based in Barbados,
but who used to trawl for shrimp off Guyana, some 300 miles South of Barbados.

The size of the shell varies between 20 mm and 35 mm.

Distribution
This marine, continental-shelf species occurs off Tobago; 
also off French Guiana.
Despite many deepwater dredgings over time, off West coast Barbados, 
by John Lewis(1960s), by Finn Sander(1970s) and by David Hunt(1980s)
this species is yet to be brought to light from 'Bajan' waters.

References

 Usticke, G. W. Nowell. 1968. Caribbean Cones from St. Croix and the Lesser Antilles.  31 pp., 4 pls. Author.
 Puillandre N., Duda T.F., Meyer C., Olivera B.M. & Bouchet P. (2015). One, four or 100 genera? A new classification of the cone snails. Journal of Molluscan Studies. 81: 1–23

External links
 The Conus Biodiversity website
 

bajanensis
Gastropods described in 1968